Agostino Roscelli (27 July 1818 – 7 May 1902), also known as Augustine Roscelli, and Augustin Roscelli, was an Italian priest who inspired social change in Genoa, Italy for children and disadvantaged women. He was canonized a saint in the Catholic Church in 2001 by Pope John Paul II.

Life

On 27 July 1818, Agostino was born in Bargone de Casarza, in Liguria, in northern Italy. His parents, Domenico Roscelli and Maria Gianelli, had him baptized the same day out of fear that he may not survive. Despite his early health problems, Agostino would grow into a quiet intellectual, receiving his basic education from the parish priest, Fr. Andrea Garibaldi. These times were brief however, as he would spend a large part of his childhood caring for his poor farming family's sheep in the mountains. During these solitary times, he would fill his hours with prayer.

In May 1835, at the age of 17, Agostino attended a parish mission given by a visiting priest, Fr. Antonio Maria Gianelli (parish priest of Chiavari and later bishop of Bobbio). This mission thoroughly convinced him he had a call to the priesthood, a calling that would not be easy considering the poor financial state his family was in. Despite this, he attacked the situation with prayer, which led to financial aid that allowed him to study in Genoa, Italy. One of his benefactors was Fr. Guanelli (Gianelli?) who found him a post as a sacristan and guardian of a church attached to a girls school. He was finally ordained on 19 September 1846.

Agostino was shortly thereafter appointed to a working class parish, San Martino d’Albaro, in 1846. He would later move to the Church of Consolation in Genoa in 1854. As a parish priest he soon made a positive impression with his obvious zeal and austerity in life. He spent long hours in the confessional, which developed his deep concern for the youth of the area. The boys of the parish were often tempted into a life of crime, having little to no education. The girls were even worse off, having less education than the boys, and were liable to seek menial work in the city, often being seduced or enticed into a life of prostitution.

Seeing a great need for change, Agostino set about forming a new type of job training for girls. He gathered together a group of young women, and with them founded a "sewing workshop", in which girls could receive practical and professional training as well as Christian instruction. Not wanting to neglect the boys, he would also found a "young craftsman" institute for them in 1858. He would later go on to establish a residential school to train young women who were in danger of starvation or falling into prostitution because they had no support.

In 1872 Agostino began a ministry to prisoners, working especially with those condemned to death. Two years later, in 1874, he was appointed Warden and Chaplain of the new provincial orphanage, Monte dei Fieschine, a post he held for 22 years. During that time he would baptize over 8,000 children, as well as providing care for young single mothers, not condemning them but seeing them as simple souls led astray on account of lack of rewarding work.

He lived in an atmosphere of intense prayer, something that would inspire those around him, and especially his helpers. The women who ran the sewing workshop, known as "Roscelli's Collaborators", decided their mission would be greatly helped if they were to consecrate themselves to Christ in a more formal way. Agostino was reluctant to start a religious congregation, but was encouraged to seek the advice and approval of Pope Pius IX.

Pope Pius IX's reply was simple, "May God bless you and your good works". This was what Agostino needed however, and he would go on to found the Institute of Sisters of the Immaculata on 15 October 1876.
Agostino would induct the first of the nuns a week later, going on to act as their spiritual director. He would oversee the early growth of the order beyond Genoa, and eventually beyond Italy.

Till the very end of his life, Agostino would describe himself simply as a "poor priest", ever humble as to his accomplishments. On 7 May 1902, he died of natural causes in Genoa, Italy. He was 83 years old.

Sainthood
The road to sainthood started for Agostino on 18 January 1932, when the informative, or information gathering process began. After nearly 50 more years, his cause for sainthood was officially declared on 11 September 1980. Nine years later, on 21 December 1989, Agostino was declared Venerable by Pope John Paul II in a decree of heroic virtues.

Beatification
On 17 May 1995, Agostino was officially declared Blessed by Pope John Paul II.

Canonization
99 years after his death, Agostino was officially declared a saint by Pope John Paul II on 10 June 2001.

Gallery

References

External links
 SQPN - Saint Agostino Roscelli
Saint of the Day - Saint Agostino Roscelli
 Artist Denys Savchenko
 Vatican Archives
 Institute of Sisters of the Immaculata
Agostino Roscelli - The priest who saved boys from a life of crime and girls from prostitution
Butler's Lives of the Saints - Saint Augustine Roscelli

19th-century Italian Roman Catholic priests
20th-century Italian Roman Catholic priests
Founders of Catholic religious communities
1818 births
1902 deaths
Clergy from Genoa
Canonizations by Pope John Paul II
Venerated Catholics by Pope John Paul II